The Wayward Girl is a 1957 American drama film directed by Lesley Selander, written by Houston Branch and Frederick Louis Fox and starring Marcia Henderson, Peter Walker, Katherine Barrett, Whit Bissell, Rita Lynn and Peg Hillias. It was released on September 22, 1957 by Republic Pictures.

Plot
A girl is erroneously convicted of manslaughter in the death of her oppressive stepmother's boyfriend, when in fact the stepmother killed him after the girl had knocked him out. Henderson gains release from prison via a parole-for-pay scheme of which she is unaware. She gets into more trouble when the man for whom she works makes advances and she runs away after injuring him. By the end of the film, the parole racket has been exposed, and Henderson has been exonerated of the murder.

Cast       
Marcia Henderson as Judy Wingate
Peter Walker as Tommy Gray
Katherine Barrett as Frances Wingate
Whit Bissell as Ira Molson
Rita Lynn as Midge Brackett
Peg Hillias as Hilda Carlson
Tracey Roberts as Dot Martin
Ray Teal as Sheriff
Barbara Eden as Molly 
Ric Roman as Eddie Nolan
Grandon Rhodes as Dist. Atty. Nevins
Francis De Sales as Investigator Butler 
Jesslyn Fax as Older prisoner egging on the fight
John Maxwell as Parole agent
Herb Vigran as Used furniture buyer

References

External links 
 

1957 films
1950s English-language films
American drama films
1957 drama films
Republic Pictures films
Films directed by Lesley Selander
Films scored by Raoul Kraushaar
1950s American films